Saint-Germain-sur-Ay is a commune in the Manche department in Normandy in north-western France. It is located at the mouth of the river Ay.

See also
Communes of the Manche department

References

Saintgermainsuray